Dmitry Ivanovich is an appellation composed of the given name and patronymic (see also Eastern Slavic naming customs). 

It may refer to:
Dmitry Donskoy (1350–1389), Dmitri Ivanovich Donskoy, Grand Prince of Moscow between 1359 and 1389
Dmitri Ivanovich (1481–1521), Prince of Uglich and son of Ivan III of Moscow
Dmitry Ivanovich (grandson of Ivan III) (1483–1509), heir to the Russian throne, son of Ivan the Young and grandson of Ivan III of Moscow
Tsarevich Dmitry Ivanovich of Russia (1552–1553), eldest son and heir of Ivan the Terrible
Tsarevich Dmitry Ivanovich of Russia (born 1582) (Dmitry of Uglich), youngest son of Ivan the Terrible